John Linehan may refer to:

 John Linehan (entertainer) (born 1952), Northern Irish entertainer
 John Linehan (basketball) (born 1978), American basketball player and coach

See also
 J. M. A. Lenihan (John Mark Anthony Lenihan, 1918–1993), British clinical physicist and science author